Books of the Art or The Art Trilogy is an incomplete trilogy of novels by British writer Clive Barker, of which only the first two have been published. The first book, The Great and Secret Show, was first published in 1989 and was followed by the second book, Everville, in 1994. The third book has yet to be written and there is currently no schedule for its release. Of plans for the third book, Barker has stated that the book will be "a big book when it comes" and that he wants to write it with "as much feeling as possible".

The trilogy has been cited as an example of Barker's use of magic as a motif to "comment upon the work of the creator of art" and Barker himself has used the term to describe transformative magic that is used as "windows through which to glimpse the miraculous". The series thus far has been compared to J. R. R. Tolkien's The Lord of the Rings.

Synopsis

The Great and Secret Show

The Great and Secret Show follows Fletcher and Jaffe, two humans that have transcended reality to become super-human. The two initially worked together but became adversaries when it became clear that Jaffe was intent on gaining control of Quiddity, a dream sea that humans can access only three times in their lives. The two men end up siring children by raping four teenage girls with the intention that they will continue their battles, only for two of their children to fall in love.

Everville

Everville delves deeper into the mythology of the cosm (essentially, Earth) and the metacosm (another plane of existence containing the dream sea Quiddity). The character Harry D'Amour appears in the novel as a main character and some of the characters from the previous novel also make appearances.

Untitled third novel
As Barker has yet to write the third book he has yet to confirm any concrete plot but has stated some of its basic themes. He declared:

Barker has also stated that he will not write the third book until he has finished the last book in The Books of Abarat series, which he said could take years and would also be dependent on whether or not he will write the sequel to Galilee first. In 2014 he confirmed via Facebook that the book would be written and that he has "figured out" how he would write the ending.

Reception
Critical reception for the trilogy to date has been mixed. Common elements of criticism tend to center around the number of characters and subplots, which caused an Everville reviewer to write that "when you weed out the subplots, you find there is no main plot". Author David Foster Wallace was critical of The Great and Secret Show and wrote that while the book was "not without some cool sections" it was also overly pretentious. Publishers Weekly panned the first novel but praised the second, which they felt "confirms the author's position not only as one of horror's most potent and fertile minds but also as one of modern fiction's premier metaphysicians".

Comic book series
Between March 2006 and May 2007 IDW Publishing released a 12-part comic book adaptation of The Great and Secret Show. A complete collection of the comics was released in 2007.

References

Works by Clive Barker